For a list of mobile only frameworks see Multiple phone web based application framework.

Below is a list of rich web application frameworks:

See also
 List of platform-independent GUI libraries

Rich web applications
Rich web application frameworks